Aleš Höffer (9 December 1962 – 14 December 2008) was a Czechoslovak athlete specialising in the sprint hurdles. He is best known for winning the gold medal at the 1988 European Indoor Championships. He also represented his country at the 1987 World Championships reaching the semifinals.

His personal bests were 13.53 seconds in the 110 metres hurdles (+1.4 m/s; Moscow 1987) and 7.56 seconds in the 60 metres hurdles (Budapest 1988).

International competitions

References

1962 births
2008 deaths
Czechoslovak male hurdlers
Czech male hurdlers
Athletes from Prague